Charles S. Craik is an American chemist, currently at University of California, San Francisco and an Elected Fellow of the American Academy of Arts & Sciences.

References

Year of birth missing (living people)
Living people
University of California, San Francisco faculty
21st-century American chemists